Interstate 20 (I‑20) is a major east–west Interstate Highway in the Southern United States. I-20 runs  beginning at an interchange with I-10 in Scroggins Draw, Texas, and ending at an interchange with I-95 in Florence, South Carolina. Between Texas and South Carolina, I-20 runs through northern Louisiana, Mississippi, Alabama, and Georgia. The major cities that I-20 connects to include Dallas, Texas; Shreveport, Louisiana; Jackson, Mississippi; Birmingham, Alabama; Atlanta, Georgia; and Columbia, South Carolina.

From its terminus at I-95, the highway continues about  eastward into the city of Florence as I-20 Business (I-20 Bus.).

Route description

|-
|TX
|
|-
|LA
|
|-
|MS
|
|-
|AL
|
|-
|GA
|
|-
|SC
|
|-
|Total
|
|}

I-20 runs from Texas to South Carolina serving major southern economic hubs such as Dallas–Fort Worth and Atlanta.

Texas

I-20 begins in Scroggins Draw at a fork with I-10. From there, the highway travels east-northeastward through Odessa, Midland, and Abilene before turning eastward toward the Dallas–Fort Worth metroplex. The La Entrada al Pacífico corridor runs along I-20 between US Route 385 (US 385) and Farm to Market Road 1788 (FM 1788). Between Monahans and I-10, I-20 has an  speed limit.

From the highway's opening in the 1960s through 1977, I-20 originally went through the heart of the metroplex via the Dallas–Fort Worth Turnpike. This old route is now signed I-30 (Dallas–Fort Worth Turnpike and from US 80/I-30 intersection at Mesquite to Downtown Dallas), US 80 (former stretch between I-635 and Terrell), and Spur 557 (bypass around Terrell). In 1977, I-20 was rerouted to go through the southern sections of Fort Worth, Arlington, Grand Prairie, Dallas, and Mesquite. It split off from the old route initially at I-820 in west Fort Worth the later on at its current junction near Aledo in Parker County. It rejoins the old route near Terrell. Part of I-20 in Dallas used to be signed as I-635 and shares the Lyndon B. Johnson Freeway name with the remainder of I-635. Parts on the south side of Fort Worth were originally signed as I-820.

I-20 continues eastward from Terrell, bypassing Tyler, Longview, and Marshall before crossing the Louisiana border near Waskom.

Louisiana

In Louisiana, I-20 roughly parallels US 80 through the northern part of the state.

Entering the state from near Waskom, Texas, the highway immediately enters the Shreveport–Bossier City metropolitan area, intersecting I-49 near downtown Shreveport and passing close to Barksdale Air Force Base in Bossier City.

I-20 traverses mainly rural, hilly terrain, bypassing Minden, Grambling, and Ruston before reaching Monroe.

From Monroe, I-20 enters flatter terrain as it approaches the Mississippi River. Before crossing the Mississippi, the highway passes Tallulah. At the Mississippi River, I-20 leaves Louisiana and enters Vicksburg.

Mississippi

Upon entering Mississippi by crossing the Mississippi River, I-20 immediately enters Vicksburg. Between Edwards and Clinton, the highway mostly follows the original two-lane routing of US 80. In Jackson, I-20 sees a short concurrency with both I-55 and US 49. Also in Jackson is an unusually expansive stack interchange, at the junction of I-20, I-55 north, and US 49 south. The interchange replaces a former directional interchange at I-55 north and a cloverleaf interchange at US 49. From the stack, I-20 continues eastward to Meridian, where it begins the nearly  overlap with I-59.

The route of the Mississippi section of I-20 is defined in Mississippi Code § 65-3-3.

Alabama

I-20 (along with I-59) crosses the Alabama state line near York, and it stays conjoined as it passes through western Alabama and Tuscaloosa. At Birmingham, the two highways pass through downtown together before splitting at exit 130 just east of Birmingham–Shuttlesworth International Airport. I-20 continues eastward through Oxford–Anniston and the Talladega National Forest, passing by Talladega Superspeedway in the process, which is visible from the highway.

Also in Birmingham, the intersection of I-20/I-59 and I-65 was known as a Malfunction Junction because of the interchange's somewhat-confusing design, and the number of traffic accidents that occurred there. This section of the Interstate and its interchanges have since been reconfigured.

Georgia

I-20 enters Georgia near Tallapoosa and after passing through western Georgia, it enters the Atlanta metropolitan area. On clear days, eastbound motorists get their first view of Downtown Atlanta as they come over the top of Six Flags Hill. The Six Flags Over Georgia amusement park is easily visible off exit 46 eastbound. The highway then passes through the center of Atlanta, meeting with I-75 and I-85, which share a common expressway (the Downtown Connector). It continues through the Atlanta metropolitan area eastward and through the eastern half of Georgia until it exits the state, crossing the Savannah River at Augusta.

Throughout the state, I-20 is conjoined with unsigned State Route 402 (SR 402). Also, I-20 from the Alabama state line to I-285 in Atlanta is named the "Tom Murphy Freeway", but it is called the "Ralph David Abernathy Freeway" within I-285. The Interstate Highway is also named the Purple Heart Highway from I-285 in DeKalb County to US 129/US 441/SR 24 in Madison, Georgia, and it is called the Carl Sanders Highway from US 129/US 441/SR 24 to the South Carolina state line.

South Carolina

Upon leaving Augusta, I-20 crosses the Savannah River and enters the Palmetto State and heads northeastward, bypassing Aiken and Lexington before reaching the state capital of Columbia, which can be reached most directly by taking I-26 east at exit 64 ("Malfunction Junction"), then, almost immediately, I-126/US 76.

At Columbia, I-20 bypasses the city to the north and again turns northeastward, bypassing Fort Jackson and Camden. After crossing the Wateree River, it turns due east and passes by tiny Bishopville, before reaching the Florence area. It is near Florence where I-20 sees its eastern terminus at I-95.

I-20 in the Palmetto State is known as either the J. Strom Thurmond Freeway or John C. West Freeway. The first section to be completed was the bridge over the Savannah River in 1965; the last, the section between US 401 and I-95 (including the business spur), opened in August 1975.

History

I-20 was built in 1957 connecting Texas to the east coast running through Shreveport, Ruston, and Monroe making it their first Interstate.

I-20's exit numbers in Georgia were changed in 2000.

Future

In 2003, the North Carolina Department of Transportation proposed extending I-20 eastward from Florence to Wilmington at the behest of North Carolina Governor Mike Easley and his 'Strategic Transportation Plan' for the southeast portion of the state. The proposed route would follow US 76 east from Florence to Whiteville, North Carolina, then parallel US 74/US 76 into Wilmington. Part of this route is already designated the future eastern extension of I-74. As part of the 2005 Safe, Accountable, Flexible, Efficient Transportation Equity Act: A Legacy for Users transportation legislation, North Carolina received $5 million (equivalent to $ in ) for a feasibility study for this extension. While this extension has considerable support among towns in southeastern North Carolina, the South Carolina Department of Transportation has stated that they have no interest in upgrading their portion of US 76 to an Interstate. Instead, South Carolina is concentrating their efforts on plans to build I-73 that will terminate near Myrtle Beach. This proposed extension is currently unfunded.

Junction list
Texas
  at Scroggins Draw
  in Pecos
  in Odessa
  in Big Spring
  east of Roscoe. The highways travel concurrently to the Tye–Abilene city line.
  in Abilene
  in Baird
  in Cisco
  south-southeast of Brazos
  in Hudson Oaks
  northeast of Aledo
  in Fort Worth
  in Fort Worth 
  in Benbrook
  in Fort Worth
  in Fort Worth. I-20/US 287 travels concurrently to Arlington.
  in Grand Prairie
  in Dallas
  on the Dallas–Lancaster city line
  on the Dallas–Hutchins city line
  on the Dallas–Balch Springs city line
  in Balch Springs
  in Lindale
  south-southeast of Winona
  northeast of Kilgore. The highways travel concurrently to Longview.
  in Marshall
  west-southwest of Jonesville. The highways travel concurrently to west of Waskom.
Louisiana
  in Greenwood
  in Shreveport
  in Shreveport
  in Shreveport
  in Shreveport
  in Shreveport
  in Shreveport. The highways travel concurrently to Bossier City.
  in Bossier City
  near Haughton
  in Dixie Inn. The highways travel concurrently to Minden.
  southeast of Minden
  in Ruston
  east-northeast of Calhoun
  in Monroe
  in Rayville
  in Tallulah
  in Delta. The highways travel concurrently to Clinton, Mississippi.
Mississippi
  in Vicksburg. The highways travel concurrently through Vicksburg.
  in Jackson. I-20/US 49 travels concurrently to Pearl.
  in Jackson. I-20/I-55 travels concurrently to Richland
  in Brandon
  in Brandon
  east-southeast of Lake
  west-southwest of Meridian. The highways travel concurrently to Meridian.
  in Meridian. The highways travel concurrently to Birmingham.
  in Meridian. The highways travel concurrently through Meridian.
  in Meridian
  west-northwest of Kewanee
Alabama
  near Cuba
  south of Knoxville
  in Tuscaloosa
  in Tuscaloosa
  in Tuscaloosa
  in Tuscaloosa
  south of Lake View. The highways travel concurrently to Bessemer.
  southwest of McCalla
  in Birmingham
  in Birmingham
  in Birmingham
  in Birmingham
  in Irondale
  in Leeds
  on the Leeds–Moody line
  northwest of Cooks Springs. The highways travel concurrently to Pell City.
  in Pell City
  in Riverside
  east of Oxford
Georgia
  in Bremen
  in Atlanta
  in Atlanta
  in Atlanta
  on the Panthersville–Candler-McAfee CDP line
  southeast of Lithonia. The highways travel concurrently to Covington.
  in Social Circle
  in Madison
  in Barnett
  north of Thomson
  south of Appling
  in Augusta
South Carolina
  in North Augusta
  in North Augusta
  north-northeast of Aiken
  southeast of Batesburg-Leesville
  east of Lexington
  north of Oak Grove
  on the Seven Oaks–St. Andrews CDP line
  in St. Andrews
  north of Columbia
  in Columbia
  in Dentsville
  on the Dentsville–Woodfield CDP line
  in Lugoff
  in Camden
  southwest of Bishopville
  northeast of Lamar
  in Florence

Auxiliary routes
Two I-420s were planned but never completed or built. One was to be a bypass around Monroe, Louisiana, but was never built. The other I-420 was planned as a bypass to the south of Downtown Atlanta. Due to anti-freeway sentiments, this I-420 was never completed, and the already-built portion has been signed as State Route 154 (SR 154)/SR 166, named the Langford Parkway (formerly the Lakewood Freeway).

 Shreveport, Louisiana: I-220
 Jackson, Mississippi: I-220
 Augusta, Georgia: I-520
 Fort Worth, Texas: I-820

See also

References

External links

 
 I-20 on Interstate-Guide.com
 Proposed I-20 extension in North Carolina

 
20